Valencia Colleges (Bukidnon), Incorporated (VCI), is a private non-sectarian institution of higher learning located at Hagkol, Valencia City, Bukidnon, Philippines. Established in 1989, it is a non-stock corporation. It offers preschool, grade school, junior high school, senior high school, college, and graduate school.

History

The idea of establishing a private non-sectarian college in the City of Valencia (then a municipality) was hatched in the late 1980s. A group of Ph.D. students of Mindanao Polytechnic State College in Cagayan de Oro, inspired by their professor, Atty. Isaias P. Giduquio, former civil service regional director of Region X (formerly Don Mariano Marcos Polytechnic State College, Cagayan de Oro), formed a non-stock corporation aimed at organizing a school of higher education. This core group of planners included Giduquio, Alexander B. Amador, Irene B. Antonio, Reynaldo B. Antonio, Quipte Consus, Mario Basalo, and Pablito Intong.

Valencia was, at the time, a city in the making. The growth in population, agriculture, business, and industry was phenomenal. Valencia had become a major destination of migrants from Luzon and Visayas as well as from the provinces and cities of Mindanao. With this scenario, the planners saw the highly trained and skilled manpower and therefore, the need to establish professional and a non-sectarian institution of higher learning which would provide the training for would-be professionals and skilled workers.

Valencia Colleges was formally organized on September 25, 1989, with fifteen founding members, ten of whom were elected officers for administration: Alexander B. Amador, president; Melquiades G. Clarito, vice-president; Reynaldo B. Antonio, Sr., treasurer; Ladisla T. Giduquio, secretary; and Gracia Caballero, auditor. The other members of the board included Epifenio Calos, Valentina Calos, Isaias Sealza, Camilo Pepito, Irene Antonio, Encarnita Amador, Quipte Consus, Isaias Giduquio, Mario Basalo, and Pablito Intong.

On March 13, 1990, the school was incorporated under SEC Registration No. 174651, henceforth to be known officially as Valencia Colleges (Bukidnon) Incorporated, in short VCI. The name Bukidnon was inserted to emphasize the location of the institution to make it distinct from the town of Valencia, Bohol.

Location 
VCI's main campus used to be located at T.N. Pepito St., Valencia City, Bukidnon, not far from the town plaza across the National Highway. Classes were housed in a rented building formerly occupied by the Carmelite Sisters. Due to insufficient classrooms, high school classes were held at daytime and college classes were held in evening. While the high school department has remained in this original site to date, the undergraduate and graduate classes were moved to barangay Hagkol, 1.5 kilometers northeast of the city Poblacion, in 2003. The one-hectare new school site in Hagkol was donated by the family of landowner Efipanio Calos. The land was valued at P100,000.

Valencia Colleges is in the heart of the province of Bukidnon being situated inside Valencia City, between 10 municipalities in the south and 10 municipalities and one city (Malaybalay) in the north. Valencia City, Bukidnon is 27 km south of Malaybalay City, the capital of Bukidnon; 118 km to Cagayan de Oro; and 140 km to Davao City. VCI is approximately within midway between Cagayan de Oro and Davao City.

See also 
Valencia City, Bukidnon
Education in the Philippines

References

External links
 
 VCI official active Facebook account

Education in Valencia, Bukidnon
Educational institutions established in 1989
Universities and colleges in Bukidnon
High schools in the Philippines
1989 establishments in the Philippines